Charles Alerte (born 22 July 1982) is a Haitian former footballer.

Career statistics

International

International goals
Scores and results list Haiti's goal tally first.

References

1982 births
Living people
Haitian footballers
Haiti international footballers
2002 CONCACAF Gold Cup players
Association football forwards
Aigle Noir AC players